Malintrat is a commune in the Puy-de-Dôme département in Auvergne-Rhône-Alpes in central France.

Malintrat is located at east of Clermont-Ferrand between autoroutes A710 and A720, north of the Clermont-Ferrand/Auvergne airport in Aulnat. Malintrat forms part of the Clermont-Ferrand urban area.

History
In 1839, part of the commune separated to form a new commune, Aulnat.

Demographics

Notable people
Florence Nibart-Devouard, former chair of the Wikimedia Foundation board of trustees

See also
Communes of the Puy-de-Dôme department

References

Communes of Puy-de-Dôme